"Avril 14th" is a piano instrumental by the electronic musician Richard D. James, under his pseudonym Aphex Twin, released on his 2001 album Drukqs. It was recorded using a Disklavier, a computer-controlled piano.

Composition 

Whereas most of James's music is electronic, "Avril 14th" is a piano composition. It was recorded using a Disklavier, a piano with a mechanism that reads MIDI data and plays the keyboard without human input. The clicking of the mechanism is audible on the recording. According to Fact writer Scott Wilson, "The result is something that sounds human but not quite." Several critics likened it to the works of Erik Satie. Fact described it as a "a butterfly-fragile float" of "piano calm".

Reception 
Reviewing Drukqs in 2001, Pitchfork wrote that tracks including "'Avril 14th' ... rove dangerously close to the Windham Hill new age aesthetic of the 80s". It surprised some listeners expecting more electronic work, though Fact wrote in 2017 that it was "a perfect embodiment of Aphex and the line he constantly treads between the mechanical and the human". As of April 2017, "Avril 14th" had been streamed 124 million times on Spotify, 106 million more than Aphex Twin's 1999 single "Windowlicker".

Appearances 
"Avril 14th" has been used in films including Marie Antoinette (2006), Four Lions (2010), and Her (2013). For Four Lions, James rerecorded the track with a minor edit. In 2007, "Avril 14th" was sampled for a song used in the SNL digital short "Iran So Far." As SNL owner NBC had not obtained the rights to use the track, the short was quickly removed from YouTube.

The American rapper Kanye West used elements of "Avril 14th" for his 2010 track "Blame Game." According to James, after he was sent an early version of "Blame Game" with a heavily timestretched sample of "Avril 14th," he offered to rerecord the piece at a different tempo; West's team replied with "It's not yours, it's ours, and we're not even asking you any more," and tried to avoid paying for its use. The final "Blame Game" used a rerecorded version of "Avril 14th" rather than a sample, and James received credit.

On December 4, 2018, Aphex Twin released two alternative versions of "Avril 14th" on his web store, subtitled "reversed music not audio" and "half speed alternative version". A third version, subtitled "doubletempo half speed" was quickly removed from the store the same day.

Other versions 
Alarm Will Sound included their rendition of "Avril 14th" on the 2005 album Acoustica: Alarm Will Sound Performs Aphex Twin.

Murcof and Vanessa Wagner recorded a version of "Avril 14th" for their 2016 album, Statea. Two additional versions were released on their 2017 EP, EP.03, including a remix by Loscil.

References 

2001 compositions
Aphex Twin songs
Songs written by Aphex Twin